Denys Solonenko (born 25 October 1992) is a Ukrainian boxer. He competed at the 2016 Summer Olympics in the men's light heavyweight event, in which he was eliminated in the round of 32 by Teymur Mammadov.

References

External links
 
 

1992 births
Living people
Ukrainian male boxers
Olympic boxers of Ukraine
Boxers at the 2016 Summer Olympics
Light-heavyweight boxers
21st-century Ukrainian people